Thomas J. Fee (January 6, 1931 – August 7, 2013) was an American Democratic politician who served as a member of the Pennsylvania House of Representatives.

Biography
Fee was born in New Castle, Pennsylvania on January 6, 1931. 

In 1973, he co-sponsored legislation with Rep. Anita Palermo Kelly to improve the quality of medical care available to Pennsylvanians and address the growing shortage of doctors across the Commonwealth of Pennsylvania by improving training requirements for physicians' assistants in order to enable those healthcare professionals to perform a wider range of medical procedures under the supervision of qualified physicians.

He died at a nursing home in New Castle on August 7, 2013.

References

1931 births
2013 deaths
Democratic Party members of the Pennsylvania House of Representatives
People from New Castle, Pennsylvania